The M166 is a range of inline-four engines produced by Mercedes-Benz from 1997 to 2005, before it was succeeded by the M266 engine from 2004.

Design 
The M166 is transversely mounted and features 2 valves per cylinder with multipoint injection. The engine is used in W168 A-Class models that feature the 'sandwich concept', where the engine is mounted at a 59-degree angle just behind the front axle. This allows for better weight distribution as well as increased safety, as the engine slides underneath the floorpan instead of into the cabin in the event of a head-on collision.

Models

M166 E14 
 1997–2004 W168 A140

M166 E16 
 2001–2005 W639 Vito 1.6
 1997–2004 W168 A160

M166 E19 
 1999–2004 W168 A190
 2001–2005 W639 Vito 1.9
 2001-2005 W414 Vaneo 1.9

M166 E21 
 2002–2004 W168 A210

References 

Mercedes-Benz engines
Straight-four engines
Gasoline engines by model